The M Word is a 2014 American comedy-drama film directed by Henry Jaglom and starring Tanna Frederick, Michael Imperioli, Corey Feldman, Frances Fisher, Gregory Harrison and Mary Crosby.

Cast
Tanna Frederick
Michael Imperioli
Corey Feldman
Frances Fisher
Gregory Harrison
Mary Crosby
Eliza Roberts
Stephen Howard
Robert Hallak
Zack Norman
Sharon Angela
Ron Vignone
Cathy Arden
Michael Emil
Simon O. Jaglom
David Frederick
Jane Van Voorhis
David Proval
Julie Davis

Casting
On October 24, 2011, it was announced that Feldman was cast in the film.  On November 18, 2011, it was announced that Frederick was cast in the film.

Release
The film was released in theaters in Los Angeles and New York City on April 30, 2014.

Reception
The film has a 44% rating on Rotten Tomatoes.  Chuck Bowen of Slant Magazine awarded the film three stars out of four.

Scott Foundas of Variety gave the film a negative review, calling it "lively but wildly erratic".

References

External links
 
 

American comedy-drama films
Films directed by Henry Jaglom
2014 comedy-drama films
2010s English-language films
2010s American films